Ye-One Rhie (born 1987) is a German politician of Korean descent who has been serving as a member of the Bundestag since the 2021 German federal election, representing the Aachen I district.

Early life and career 
Rhie was born in Aachen to South Korean parents. She studied political science and communication studies at RWTH Aachen University from 2006 to 2012.

Rhie began her professional career at the Bertelsmann Foundation in Gütersloh in 2013. From 2015 until 2021, she worked as an advisor at the State Ministry on Innovation, Science and Research in Düsseldorf.

Political career 
Since 2014, Rhie has been a member of the City Council of Aachen. 

Rhie was elected to the Bundestag in the 2021 German federal election. In parliament, she has since been serving on the Committee on Education, Research and Technology Assessment.

In addition to her committee assignments, Rhie is part of the German Parliamentary Friendship Group for Relations with Benelux.

Other activities
 Business Forum of the Social Democratic Party of Germany, Member of the Political Advisory Board (since 2022)

Personal life
Rhie shares an apartment with fellow parliamentarians Lena Werner and Brian Nickholz in the Moabit district of Berlin.

References 

Living people
1987 births
German people of Korean descent
People from Aachen
Members of the Bundestag for the Social Democratic Party of Germany
21st-century German politicians
21st-century German women politicians
Female members of the Bundestag
Members of the Bundestag for North Rhine-Westphalia
Members of the Bundestag 2021–2025
RWTH Aachen University alumni